Pierre Fautrier (30 January 1923 – 10 December 2014) was a French racing cyclist. He rode in the 1947 Tour de France.

References

External links
 

1923 births
2014 deaths
French male cyclists
Cyclists from Marseille